Judd Seymore Hirsch (born March 15, 1935) is an American actor. He is known for playing Alex Rieger on the television comedy series Taxi (1978–1983), John Lacey on the NBC series Dear John (1988–1992), and Alan Eppes on the CBS series Numb3rs (2005–2010). He is also well known for his career in theatre and for his roles in films such as Ordinary People (1980), Running on Empty (1988), Independence Day (1996), A Beautiful Mind (2001), Independence Day: Resurgence (2016), Uncut Gems (2019) and The Fabelmans (2022).

He has twice won the Primetime Emmy Award for Outstanding Lead Actor in a Comedy Series, twice won the Tony Award for Best Actor in a Play, won the Golden Globe Award for Best Actor – Television Series Musical or Comedy, and was nominated twice for the Academy Award for Best Supporting Actor for his performances in Ordinary People (1980) and The Fabelmans (2022), the longest gap between Academy Award nominations in history.

Early life and education
Hirsch was born in the Bronx, New York, the son of Sally (née Kitzis) and Joseph Sidney Hirsch, an electrician. Joseph was born in New York, to a German Jewish father, Benjamin Hirsch, and an English-born mother, Rosa Hirsch Benjamin, whose family were Dutch Jews. Sally Hirsch was born in Russia, also to a Jewish family. Judd Hirsch has a brother named Roland.

He grew up in both Brooklyn and The Bronx and graduated from DeWitt Clinton High School (in The Bronx) in 1952. He earned a degree in physics from City College of New York.

After graduating from college, Hirsch served in the United States Army Reserve in 1958 at Fort Leonard Wood for six months as a surveyor. Next Hirsch worked as an engineer for Westinghouse before he found work in the theater. He studied acting at HB Studio in New York City. He graduated in 1962 from the American Academy of Dramatic Arts in New York City.

Career
Over the last several decades, Hirsch has distinguished himself in film, television, and theatre. The Los Angeles Times noted that Hirsch is "one of the very few actors who slips effortlessly from TV series to Broadway to feature films and back again, racking up awards and favorable reviews wherever he performs."

After appearing frequently on television in the 1970s, including one season (1976–1977) in the series Delvecchio, Hirsch gained stardom for his lead role of Alex Rieger in the popular sitcom Taxi, which ran from 1978 to 1983. For his performance in the series, Hirsch won the Emmy Award for Lead Actor In a Comedy Series in 1981 and 1983. In 1999, he reprised his role from Taxi for a brief moment in Man on the Moon, the biopic of his co-star from Taxi, Andy Kaufman (portrayed by Jim Carrey).

After Taxi, Hirsch played the title character on the modestly successful sitcom Dear John and in 1989 won a Golden Globe Award for Best Actor in a Television Series in a Comedy or Musical for this role. He later teamed up with Bob Newhart in the short-lived comedy George and Leo.

Hirsch received a nomination for the Academy Award for Best Supporting Actor for his role in Ordinary People (1980), which won the Academy Award for Best Picture that year. His other film performances from the decade include leading roles in the 1983 drama Without a Trace, the 1984 dramedies, Teachers and The Goodbye People, and the 1988 drama Running on Empty, directed by Sidney Lumet and co-starring River Phoenix. In 1996, Hirsch portrayed the father of Jeff Goldblum's character in the blockbuster Independence Day, a role that he later reprised in its 2016 sequel. In 2001, he played a Princeton University professor in the Academy Award-winning film A Beautiful Mind. Hirsch has more recently had supporting roles in acclaimed films such as The Meyerowitz Stories (2017) and Uncut Gems (2019).

Hirsch co-starred on the CBS Television drama Numb3rs (2005–2010) as Alan Eppes, father of FBI agent Don Eppes (Rob Morrow), and Professor Charlie Eppes (David Krumholtz). When Krumholtz was 13, he played the role of a son to Hirsch's father role in Conversations with My Father, a Herb Gardner play for which Hirsch won the Tony Award for Best Performance by a Leading Actor in a Play. Krumholtz credits Hirsch with jump-starting his career after Hirsch chose him during the audition process for Conversations. Other noteworthy stage performances include The Hot l Baltimore, Talley's Folly, and his starring role in I'm Not Rappaport, for which Hirsch also won a Tony Award in 1986.

More recently Hirsch guest-starred on episodes of Warehouse 13, Studio 60 on the Sunset Strip, Law & Order: Special Victims Unit, God Friended Me, and The Whole Truth (he reunited with Numb3rs co-star Rob Morrow), among others and lent his voice to the animated programs Tom Goes to the Mayor and American Dad! Judd has also appeared several times on the television show Maron as comedian Marc Maron's father; he has had a recurring role on The Goldbergs, playing the father of Jeff Garlin's character. In 2016, Hirsch appeared on the CBS comedy series The Big Bang Theory portraying the father of Johnny Galecki's character, Leonard.

From 2014 to 2015, he appeared as a series regular on the ABC television series Forever. From 2017 to 2018, Hirsch starred in the CBS comedy Superior Donuts which lasted two seasons.

In early 2020, Hirsch appeared in a scene as the historic Simon Wiesenthal, in season 1, episode 8 of the Amazon Prime Video show Hunters, which stars Al Pacino. In 2023, at the age of 87, he became the second-oldest acting nominee for an Academy Award, after Christopher Plummer, for his role in Steven Spielberg's film The Fabelmans (2022). He also broke the record for the longest gap between nominations.

Personal life
Hirsch was married to his first wife, Elisa Sadaune, from 1963 to 1967. Their son, Alex Hirsch, was born in 1966. Hirsch married Bonni Sue Chalkin, a fashion designer, in 1992 and the couple divorced in 2005. From this second marriage Hirsch has a daughter, Montana, and son, London.

Filmography

References

External links

TonyAwards.com Interview with Judd Hirsch
Dave Ross interview with Judd Hirsch on MyNorthwest.com

1935 births
Living people
20th-century American male actors
21st-century American Jews
21st-century American male actors
American Academy of Dramatic Arts alumni
American male film actors
American male stage actors
American male television actors
American male voice actors
American people of Dutch-Jewish descent
American people of German-Jewish descent
Best Musical or Comedy Actor Golden Globe (television) winners
City College of New York alumni
DeWitt Clinton High School alumni
Drama Desk Award winners
Jewish American male actors
Male actors from New York City
Outstanding Performance by a Lead Actor in a Comedy Series Primetime Emmy Award winners
People from the Bronx
Tony Award winners
United States Army reservists
United States Army soldiers